The Squamscott River is a  tidal river in Rockingham County, southeastern New Hampshire, in the United States. It rises at Exeter, fed by the Exeter River. The Squamscott runs north between Newfields and Stratham to Great Bay, a tidal estuary, which is connected to the Piscataqua River, itself an estuary of the Atlantic Ocean.

More specifically, after rising at the Great Bridge (a Works Progress Administration project that carries what is now New Hampshire Route 27) in downtown Exeter, the river passes the Phillips Exeter Academy boathouse, then tends north alongside the Swasey Parkway, through the haymarshes, passing by the town's water purification plant and then under Route 101, a major east–west arterial road in New Hampshire. The river next passes under Route 108 at the boundary of Newfields and Stratham. The river then debouches into Great Bay, a broad and shallow tidal estuary, just south of the mouth of the Lamprey River, arriving at the bay from Newmarket.

The Squamscott, also spelled Swampscott and Swamscott, gets its name from the Squamscott Indians, who called it Msquam-s-kook (or Msquamskek), translated as "at the salmon place" or "big water place". Plentiful game, the marshes and lush river-fed vegetation, and an abundance of fish supported the northeast Native American people who were present in the region for thousands of years until English settlers displaced them in the early 17th century. The Native American tribes of New Hampshire were most likely from the Abenaki nation, but independent of the Maine-based tribes. The name "Abenaki" and its derivatives originated from a Montagnais (Algonquin) word meaning "people of the dawn" or "easterners". In the eastern part of New Hampshire were the Pequaquaukes (or Pequakets), the Ossipees, the Minnecometts, the Piscataquas and the Squamscotts (Msquamskek).

The Phillips Exeter Academy crew team holds its practices on the Squamscott River in Exeter.

See also

 List of rivers of New Hampshire

References

External links
 Exeter Squamscott River Local Advisory Committee

Rivers of New Hampshire
Rivers of Rockingham County, New Hampshire
New Hampshire placenames of Native American origin